Olga Poltoranina  (née Dudchenko; born 27 February 1987) is a Kazakhstani biathlete. She competed in the 2010/11 and 2011/12 World Cup seasons, and represented Kazakhstan at the Biathlon World Championships 2015 in Kontiolahti.

Her husband is cross-country skier Alexey Poltoranin.

References

External links

1987 births
Living people
Kazakhstani female biathletes
Olympic biathletes of Kazakhstan
Biathletes at the 2018 Winter Olympics
Asian Games medalists in biathlon
Biathletes at the 2003 Asian Winter Games
Biathletes at the 2007 Asian Winter Games
Biathletes at the 2011 Asian Winter Games
Asian Games gold medalists for Kazakhstan
Asian Games silver medalists for Kazakhstan
Asian Games bronze medalists for Kazakhstan
Medalists at the 2003 Asian Winter Games
Medalists at the 2007 Asian Winter Games
Medalists at the 2011 Asian Winter Games